The Menina Pasture Plateau is a pre-Alpine karst plateau in Slovenia.

Geography
It is located between the Dreta Valley to the north, the Tuhinj Valley and Motnik Valley to the south, the Črnivec Pass to the west, and the Lipa Pass and Dobrovlje Plateau to the east. The highest point on the plateau is Mount Vidovnik, where there is also a lookout tower, about a 15-minute walk from the Menina Pasture Lodge.

Name
The plateau was attested in written sources in 1424 as Menino, and as Minitza in 1500. The name is believed to derive from a possessive form of the Slavic personal name *Měna. It is also possible, but less likely, that the name comes from *Mejnina planota 'border plateau', from the common noun meja 'border'. Another theory derives the name from the noun menih 'monk', in connection with the former Benedictine abbey in Gornji Grad.

References

External links

 Menina Pasture Plateau on Geopedia

Kamnik–Savinja Alps
Karst plateaus of Slovenia